Timothy Edward Sullivan Bateman (born 3 June 1987) is a rugby union player from New Zealand. He plays mostly Inside Centre.

He was head boy of Christchurch Boys' High School in Canterbury, New Zealand. He formerly played for the Crusaders and played in Japan for the Coca-Cola Red Sparks. He also had a stint at the Hurricanes in Super Rugby. In 2017, he has returned to play for the Crusaders.

Of Ngāi Tahu descent, Bateman played for the Māori All Blacks in 2008 and 2012. He has also represented New Zealand at Under 19 and Under 21 level.

Playing career

School boy rugby
While at Christchurch Boys' High School, Bateman appeared alongside All Blacks Colin Slade, Matt Todd and Owen Franks as well as former Crusader Nasi Manu.

Later career
He played six games and scored three tries in his return season. Bateman was a part of the 2017   championship winning side in 2017.

Bateman also signed with former provincial team Canterbury ahead of the 2017 Mitre 10 Cup season.

He scored a try in Canterbury's 35-13 Grand Final win against Tasman.

References

External links
Hurricanes profile
itsrugby.co.uk profile

1987 births
Living people
Canterbury rugby union players
Coca-Cola Red Sparks players
Crusaders (rugby union) players
Expatriate rugby union players in Japan
Hurricanes (rugby union) players
Māori All Blacks players
New Zealand expatriate sportspeople in Japan
Ngāi Tahu people
People educated at Christchurch Boys' High School
Rugby union centres
Rugby union players from Greymouth
Wellington rugby union players
Black Rams Tokyo players
Toshiba Brave Lupus Tokyo players
New Zealand rugby union players
Rugby union fly-halves